Willy Cartier is a French fashion model, dancer, and actor best known for his work with Givenchy.

Early life 

Willy Cartier is the son of writer and painter Jack Servoz and dancer Léa Cartier. He describes his ethnic background as Vietnamese, Senegalese, and Breton. Originally hoping for a career in acting, he attended the prestigious Cours Florent, a private drama school in Paris. He also attended the International Dance Academy, where he studied dance (classic, contemporary, and jazz) and theatre.

Career 

Cartier began modeling in 2009, and was one of the faces for Givenchy's 2010 Fall/Winter campaign.

Cartier has modeled for Chanel, Karl Lagerfeld, Jean-Paul Gaultier, Givenchy, Diesel, and Benetton. He has appeared in the magazines Vogue, Marie Claire, Apollo Novo, Elle Man, WAD magazine, V and Numéro.

As an actor, Willy Cartier has appeared in promotional materials for perfumes by Guerlain and Diesel, and in music videos for several artists, including Frank Ocean, Woodkid, Shy'm, Laurent Voulzy, and Alain Souchon. He has also had small roles in French films and television series. 
He had the titular role in the 2018 Bolivian film Søren.
He played the role of Attila The Hun on Science Channel’s “ Attila's Forbidden Tomb” in March, 2020.
He had the titular role in the 2021 French TV Serie “FUGUEUSE”.

Personal life 
Cartier lives in Paris, France.

Filmography

Feature films

References

1991 births
French male models
French people of Breton descent
French people of Senegalese descent
French people of Vietnamese descent
Living people